Stories Not To Be Told is a 2022 Spanish comedy film directed by Cesc Gay. Consisting of 5 stories, the film features an ensemble cast with Anna Castillo, Quim Gutiérrez, Verónica Echegui, Brays Efe, Alex Brendemühl, Javier Rey, Antonio de la Torre, José Coronado, Maribel Verdú, María León, Chino Darín, Alexandra Jiménez, and Nora Navas, among others.

Plot 
Reportedly displaying an "acerbic, yet tongue-in-cheek tone" according to Gay, the plot tracks five different stories concerning the characters' personal relationships.

Cast

Production 
The screenplay of Historias para no contar (Cesc Gay's ninth feature film) was penned by Gay along recurring co-scribe . Produced by Impossible Films alongside Nocontarfilm and with the participation of RTVE, Movistar+ and TVC, and funding from ICAA, Triodos Bank and ICO, the film reportedly has a budget over €3.5 million. Shooting had already begun in Barcelona by March 2021. Filming had already wrapped by May 2021.

Release 
The film had its world premiere at the 47th Toronto International Film Festival in September 2022. It was also picked up for the 'Gala RTVE' slate of the 70th San Sebastián International Film Festival. Distributed by Filmax, it was set for a 28 October 2022 theatrical release in Spain, later postponed to 25 November 2022.

Reception 
Jonathan Holland of ScreenDaily considered that rather than delivering something daring or subversive (as the title may suggest), Gay "seems to have locked the door to his comfort zone and thrown away the key", assessing that while "Gay at half throttle is never less than enjoyable", the film's dialogues are "not always as sharp as they think they are".

Accolades 

|-
| rowspan = "2" align = "center" | 2023 || rowspan = "2" | 15th Gaudí Awards || Best Supporting Actress || Anna Castillo ||  || rowspan = "2" | 
|-
| Best Supporting Actor || Alex Brendemühl || 
|}

See also 
 List of Spanish films of 2022

References 

Films directed by Cesc Gay
Films shot in Barcelona
2022 comedy films
Spanish comedy films
2020s Spanish-language films
2020s Spanish films